Hupao or Dreaming of the Tiger Spring is a spring and park in southwestern Hangzhou, Zhejiang province, China.

The water from the spring itself seeps out from quartzite and is regarded as among the finest in China. The water is popular for brewing teas, such as the local specialty, Longjing tea.

Tiger spring is also the burial place of monk Jigong.

References 

Geography of Hangzhou
Springs of China
Parks in Zhejiang
Tourist attractions in Hangzhou